Genesee Park may refer to:

 Genesee Avenue Park, a Los Angeles park near Hollywood
 Genesee Park (Colorado), first and largest of the Denver Mountain Parks (on Genesee Mountain and Bald Mountain)
 Genesee Park (Allegany County, New York)
 Genesee Park (Ontario County, New York)
 Genesee Park Historic District, the 16 contributing properties associated with the Ontario County park in Ontario County, New York
 Genesee Park (Seattle), in Seattle, Washington
 Genesee Valley Park, in Rochester, New York, along the Genesee River